Craig Werner Buck (born August 24, 1958 in Los Angeles, California) is a former volleyball player (position middle blocker) from the United States, who was a member of the American men's national team that won the gold medal at the 1984 Summer Olympics. He also competed and won the gold medal at the 1988 Summer Olympics.

See also
 USA Volleyball

References
 Profile
 

American men's volleyball players
1958 births
Living people
Olympic gold medalists for the United States in volleyball
Volleyball players from Los Angeles
Volleyball players at the 1984 Summer Olympics
Volleyball players at the 1988 Summer Olympics
Pepperdine Waves men's volleyball players
Place of birth missing (living people)
Medalists at the 1988 Summer Olympics
Medalists at the 1984 Summer Olympics
William Howard Taft Charter High School alumni
Middle blockers
Pan American Games medalists in volleyball
Pan American Games gold medalists for the United States
Medalists at the 1987 Pan American Games
20th-century American people
21st-century American people